This is a comprehensive discography of official recordings by Guster, an American alternative band from Boston, Massachusetts.

Albums

Studio albums

Live albums

Extended plays

Singles

Promotional singles

Notes

Other appearances

References

Discographies of American artists
Rock music group discographies